Kvarnström is a surname. Notable people with the surname include:

Johan Kvarnström, Finnish politician
Kurt Kvarnström (born 1948), Swedish politician

Surnames of Scandinavian origin